St. Ann Roman Catholic Church Complex (now known as St Martin de Porres Catholic Church) is a historic Catholic church at 1105 W. Bancroft and 1120 Horace Streets in Toledo, Ohio. It was added to the National Register of Historic Places in 1983.

Gallery

References

External links
Parish website

Churches on the National Register of Historic Places in Ohio
Romanesque Revival church buildings in Ohio
Roman Catholic churches in Toledo, Ohio
National Register of Historic Places in Lucas County, Ohio
African-American Roman Catholic churches